John Salavantis is an American former gridiron football coach.  He was the 22nd head football coach at Ottawa University in Ottawa, Kansas, serving for one season, in 1978, and compiling  a record of 7–3. Salavantis later workred as an assistant coach in the Canadian Football League (CFL) with the Hamilton Tiger-Cats and the Ottawa Rough Riders. Currently, Salavantis serves as the radio colour analyst on AM 900 CHML for the Hamilton Tiger-Cats.

Salavantis graduated from Drury High School in North Adams, Massachusetts, before attending Ottawa, where he played football for four years as an offensive tackle.

Head coaching record

College

References

1940s births
Living people
American football offensive tackles
Canadian Football League announcers
Hamilton Tiger-Cats coaches
McPherson Bulldogs football coaches
Missouri Southern Lions football coaches
NFL Europe (WLAF) coaches
Ottawa Braves football coaches
Ottawa Braves football players
Ottawa Rough Riders coaches
High school football coaches in Kansas
Junior college football coaches in the United States
People from North Adams, Massachusetts
Players of American football from Massachusetts
Sportspeople from Berkshire County, Massachusetts